The 2022 NASCAR Cup Series Championship Race was a NASCAR Cup Series race held on November 6, 2022, at Phoenix Raceway in Avondale, Arizona. Contested over 312 laps on the one mile (1.6 km) oval, it was the 36th and final race of the 2022 NASCAR Cup Series season.

Report

Background

Phoenix Raceway – also known as PIR – is a one-mile, low-banked tri-oval race track located in Avondale, Arizona. It is named after the nearby metropolitan area of Phoenix. The motorsport track opened in 1964 and currently hosts two NASCAR race weekends annually. PIR has also hosted the IndyCar Series, CART, USAC and the Rolex Sports Car Series. The raceway is currently owned and operated by International Speedway Corporation.

The raceway was originally constructed with a  road course that ran both inside and outside of the main tri-oval. In 1991 the track was reconfigured with the current  interior layout. PIR has an estimated grandstand seating capacity of around 67,000. Lights were installed around the track in 2004 following the addition of a second annual NASCAR race weekend.

Phoenix Raceway is home to two annual NASCAR race weekends, one of 13 facilities on the NASCAR schedule to host more than one race weekend a year. The track is both the first and last stop in the western United States, as well as the fourth and the last track on the schedule.

On October 28, 2022, Hendrick Motorsports announced that Alex Bowman would return to the No. 48 car for this race, having sat out the rest of Round of 12 and Round of 8 races (eliminating himself from Round of 12) after he suffered a concussion at the Texas playoff race. Ty Gibbs was supposed to participate in the race, but withdrew and was replaced by Daniel Hemric after the sudden death of Coy Gibbs after qualifying.

Championship drivers
Joey Logano was the first of four drivers to clinch a spot in the Championship 4, winning the first race of the Round of 8 at Las Vegas. Christopher Bell clinched the second spot in the Championship 4, winning the final race of the Round of 8 at Martinsville. Ross Chastain and Chase Elliott clinched the remaining two spots based on points.

Entry list
 (R) denotes rookie driver.
 (i) denotes driver who is ineligible for series driver points.
 (CC) denotes Championship Contender.

Practice

Practice results

Qualifying

Qualifying results

Race
Note: Joey Logano, Christopher Bell, Ross Chastain, and Chase Elliott are not eligible for stage points because of their participation in the Championship 4.

Stage Results

Stage One
Laps: 60

Stage Two
Laps: 125

Final Stage Results

Stage Three
Laps: 127

Race statistics
 Lead changes: 11 among 16 different drivers
 Cautions/Laps: 6 for 39
 Red flags: 0
 Time of race: 2 hours, 58 minutes and 42 seconds
 Average speed:

Media

Television
NBC Sports covered the race on the television side. Rick Allen, two–time Phoenix winner Jeff Burton and three-time Phoenix winner Dale Earnhardt Jr. called the race from the broadcast booth. Dave Burns, Parker Kligerman, Marty Snider and Dillon Welch were the pit reporters. Rutledge Wood, who reported select races for NASCAR on NBC from outside the track in the city/metropolitan area of the racetrack in 2022, was at this race in-person serving as a roving reporter.

Steve Letarte, the other color commentator normally in NBC's broadcast booth, had to miss the race due to having an emergency appendectomy.

Radio
MRN covered the radio call for the race, which was also simulcast on Sirius XM NASCAR Radio. Alex Hayden, Jeff Striegle and Rusty Wallace called the action from the broadcast booth when the field races down the front straightaway. Dave Moody called the action from turns 1 & 2 and Mike Bagley called the action from turns 3 & 4. Kim Coon, Steve Post, Brienne Pedigo and Jason Toy covered the action for MRN from pit lane.

Standings after the race

Drivers' Championship standings

Manufacturers' Championship standings

Note: Only the first 16 positions are included for the driver standings.

Notes

References

2022 in sports in Arizona
NASCAR Cup Series Championship Race
NASCAR races at Phoenix Raceway
NASCAR Cup Series Championship Race